The National Black Deaf Advocates (NBDA) is the leading advocacy organization for thousands of Black deaf and hard of hearing people in the United States. Black Deaf leaders were concerned that deaf and hard-of-hearing African-Americans were not adequately represented in leadership and policy decision-making activities that were affecting their lives.

NBDA was established to address such concerns and serve as an advocacy organization that focuses on the needs of Black deaf and hard-of-hearing people in America.

Mission statement
Its mission statement is "to promote the leadership development, economic and educational opportunities, social equality, and to safeguard the general health and welfare of Black deaf and hard of hearing people."

Organization
NBDA serves as the national advocate for thousands of deaf and hard of hearing African-Americans. As a non-profit, tax-exempt, consumer-led organization, NBDA is supported by its members and other interested in furthering the mission, vision, and strategic objectives of this esteemed organization. Membership includes not only African-American adults who are deaf and hard of hearing but also deaf and hard-of-hearing people of all races, parents of children who are deaf or hard of hearing; professionals who work with the deaf and hard of hearing youth and adults; sign language interpreters; and all affiliated individuals and organizations interested in the uniqueness of Black Deaf Culture.

The Executive Board serves on a voluntary basis and has mainly of deaf and hard-of-hearing individuals to govern NBDA. Its officers (president, vice-president, treasurer, secretary) elected during the national conventions and elected board representatives from each region (Eastern, Southern, Southwestern, Midwestern, Western). NBDA has several ways in which it supports advocacy and advancement for Black Deaf Americans, primarily through programs and scholarships:

Educational advancement
When NBDA was founded, one of its concerns was to strengthen the educational and economic advancement of Black Deaf and hard-of-hearing people. That concern is still true, and one of the ways that NBDA is working on promoting educational advancement is by providing educational scholarships to undergraduate and graduate black deaf students.

Development of future leaders
Its college and youth programs prepare and provide tools for Black Deaf and hard of hearing youth and young adults with the leadership training/workshops, forum, seminars, and educational activities to become future leaders. NBDA established two programs for youth and young adults: the Collegiate Black Deaf Student Leadership Institute and the Youth Empowerment Summit.

Empowerment of black women

The Miss Black Deaf America beauty pageant is a competition for young Black Deaf women in areas of advocacy platform, unique talent, interview skills, and style/grace. Since its inception in 1983, during the second National Black Deaf Advocates Conference in Philadelphia, the pageant has crowned more than 20 Miss Black Deaf America winners. In addition to the competition, the Miss Black Deaf America Pageant also promotes young ladies through education and leadership opportunities for their professional and personal growth, and it prepares them to be role models for today’s young girls. Miss Black Deaf America winners receive college scholarships towards supporting their educational goals.

Supporting senior citizens
The Black Deaf Senior Citizen Program aims to develop and strengthen a support network for Black Deaf seniors; to assist NBDA in becoming better informed about the unique needs, concerns, and challenges faced by members of the particular segment of the Black Deaf community; and to design and implement outreach programs and activities tailored to respond to their specific needs.

News
The NBDA Connections is the official publication of NBDA exclusively for NBDA members. It is published in every season. Members and supporters of NBDA can receive regularly NBDA eNews via email by signing up at the website.

History
The story of Black Deaf Advocates goes back to 1980, when the idea was brought up to a small group of locals in Washington, DC, meeting with the board of Deaf Pride. The prow were concerned about identifying Black Deaf people, problems that prevent Black Deaf from achieving their potential, and the lack of leadership. In sharing their experiences, ideas, hopes talents, and abilities with one another, it became apparent that cultural isolation was a key factor.

At the 100th anniversary of the National Association of the Deaf in July 1980, a Black deaf caucus was held. Led by Charles "Chuck" V. Williams of Ohio, Sandi LaRue and Linwood Smith of Washington, DC, they presented issues of the NAD's lack of attentiveness to the concerns of Black Deaf Americans as well as the lack of representation of Black Deaf individuals as convention delegates. Sandi LaRue issued a statement to the convention attendees: "NAD must take action to communicate better with the Black deaf community, encourage the involvement of minorities" within the national and state organizations, and recruit more Black Deaf children in the Junior NAD and youth leadership camp. The July 6, 1980 The Cincinnati Enquirer published an article on the needs of Black Deaf people at the NAD convention in which LaRue stated to the newspaper, "We would like to get on the cover and front pages."

Momentum stayed strong, and a local Black Deaf committee in DC began the work on planning a mini-conference by, for, and about the Black Deaf experience. The first Black Deaf Conference, "Black Deaf Experience," was held on June 25–26, 1981 at Howard University in the city.

Charles "Chuck" V. Williams proposed hosting a national conference in Ohio the following year. On August 13–15, 1982, in Cleveland, Black Deaf people from all over the United States met again to address cultural and racial issues impacting the Black Deaf community. The conference theme "Black Deaf Strength through Awareness" drew more than 300 conference attendees. A debate was held as to whether a national organization should be formed. The idea was accepted.

A new organization, National Black Deaf Advocates, was officially formed. The six founding members instrumental in establishing NBDA were Lottie Crook, Ernest Hairston, Willard Shorter, Linwood Smith, Charles "Chuck" V. Williams, and Elizabeth "Ann" Wilson. In 1983 Sheryl Emery was elected as the Founding President of NBDA and established the organization's by-laws and developed the administrative guidelines. Celeste Owens served as Vice President.

Since its establishment in 1982, NBDA has grown to over 30 local chapters, crowned 23 queens as Miss Black Deaf America, hosted more than 25 National Conferences including overseas sites in Jamaica and the Virgin Islands, provided thousands of advocacy services to its members, and conducted leadership training summits for minority college students and high school aged-youth.

In 2012, it celebrated 30 years since its founding. An event was held in November that was attended by members, Deaf people from all over the world, and supporting organizations.

Milestones
 1982 First NBDA Conference was held in Cleveland, OH
 1983 First Miss Black Deaf America Pageant was held during NBDA Conference in Philadelphia, PA
 1987 National Alliance of Black Interpreters, Inc. (NAOBI) was formed out of NBDA Conference in Cleveland, OH
 1993 NBDA Conference was held in the Virgin Islands (St. Thomas)
 1997 Youth Empowerment Summit (Y.E.S!) was Established
 1999 NBDA Conference was held in Jamaica (Montego Bay)
 2004 NBDA Regional System was Implemented
 2004 NBDA Commissioned Andrew Foster Bronze Bust to Gallaudet University
 2005 Collegiate Black Deaf Student Leadership Institute (CBDSLI) was established
 2006 First BDA Regional Conferences were held in Chicago, New York City, Atlanta, and Houston
 2007 NBDA Celebrated its 25th Anniversary during NBDA Conference in St. Louis, MO
 2011 NBDA's 25th National Conference held in Charlotte, NC
 2012 NBDA Celebrated 30 Years of Advocacy in Baltimore, MD

Archive resources
 History of NBDA
 NBDA Regional Representatives
 Miss Black Deaf America History
 Andrew Foster - Father of Black Deaf Education

Regions and chapters
Power lies in its membership. Members elect an executive board to govern the organization and regional board representatives to represent the interests of its members. Each region is made up of several local city/state chapters. Chapters must support the aims of NBDA as set forth in Article II of the NBDA Bylaws.

Italics denotes inactive chapter

Cities/States that are interested in reactivating or forming a chapter-branch of NBDA are encouraged to reach out to the Executive Board using the NBDA Contact Form.

Notable contributors
 Dr. Shirley Allen, First Deaf African-American Female to Earn a Ph.D. - Former President of Houston BDA
 Dr. Glenn B. Anderson, First Deaf African-American to Earn a Ph.D. & Author of Still I Rise: The Enduring Legacy of Black Deaf Arkansans Before & After Integration - Current NBDA Board Member & Former Treasurer of Little Rock (Ark) Chapter of Black Deaf Advocates Michelle Banks, Award-winning Black Deaf Actress - Former New York City BDA Board Member Fred M. Beam, Executive Director of Invisible Hands Dance, Inc. & Founder of The Wild Zappers - Former NBDA President 2007-2009 Sheryl Emery, Executive Director of Michigan Department of Civil Rights' Division on Deaf and Hard of Hearing - First NBDA Executive Director & President 1983-1987 Ernest E. Garrett III, Superintendent of the Missouri School for the Deaf - Former NBDA President 2009-2011 Claudia Gordon, Esq., Associate Director of Public Engagement at the White House, First Black Deaf Female Lawyer, First Deaf American University-Washington College of Law graduate - Former Miss Black Deaf America 1990, Former NBDA Vice President 2002-2005 Dr. Ernest Hairston, Co-Author of Black and Deaf in America & First Deaf African-American to Earn Ph.D. from Gallaudet University - Founding Member of NBDA Duane Halliburton, Trustee on Gallaudet University's Board of Trustees - Former NBDA Treasurer 2002-2005 Pamela Lloyd-Ogoke, Trustee on Gallaudet University's Board of Trustees - Former NBDA President 1993-1997 Kimberly Lucas, First Deaf person to graduate from Hofstra University, First Black "Miss Deaf New York", - Former NBDA Board Member 2011-2013/2013-2015, Former President of New York BDA, Miss Black Deaf America 1984 Opeoluwa Sotonwa, Executive Director of Missouri Commission for the Deaf and Hard of Hearing - NBDA Vice President 2013-2015 Linwood Smith, Co-Author of Black and Deaf in America & Pioneer of Mental Health Service for Deaf People - Founding Member of NBDA Ronnie Mae Tyson, Vocational Rehabilitation Counselor - First Miss Black Deaf America 1983Past presidents
 Albert Couthen, Executive Secretary, 1982-1983
 Sheryl D. Emery, Executive Director, 1983-1987
 Celeste Owens-Samuels, Acting Executive Director, 1987-1988
 Lottie Crook, President, 1988-1990
 Carl Moore, President, 1990-1993
 Pamela Lloyd-Ogoke, President, 1993-1995 & 1995-1997
 Albert Couthen, President, 1997-2000
 Gwendolyn Powell, President, 2000-2001
 Steven Younger, Acting President, 2001-2002
 Dr. Reginald Redding, President, 2002-2005
 Thomas Samuels, President, 2005-2007
 Fred M. Beam, President, 2007-2009
 Ernest E. Garrett III, President, 2009-2011
 Benro Ogunyipe, President, 2011-2013
 Patrick Robinson, President, 2013-2015
 Tim Albert, President, 2015-2017
 Evon Black, President, 2017-2019
 Isidore Niyongabo, President, 2019-Current

Past national conferences

Past regional conferences

References

African-American organizations
Deafness organizations
Deaf culture in the United States
Organizations established in 1982
1982 establishments in the United States